PNS/M Mangro (S-133) (nickname: '"Mangrove"), was a  diesel-electric submarine based on the French  design. She was designed, built, and commissioned in Toulon, France. She was in commission from 9 August 1970 until 2 January 2006.

History

Mangro (S133) was laid down on 8 July 1968 and launched on 7 February 1970 at Toulon in France. She was commissioned in the Pakistan Navy on 8 August 1970.

In 1971, her crew began receiving training in France, and became involved in events surrounding the East Pakistan when a mutiny took place in the ship to defect to Bangladesh. At the time her crew were receiving training thirteen of the crew were East Pakistanis who planned an operation to take over the submarine and try to defect to Bangladesh from France. Mangro was ordered to report back to submarine base in Karachi on 1 April 1971 but her plan to depart was interrupted when the 13 East Pakistani enlists decided to seized the submarine.

Their plan, however, was foiled due to the advanced knowledge gained by the Naval Intelligence, leading the Navy SSG to undertake an armed action plan to counter the mutiny, resulting in the death of one mutineer while the others escaped from the base in France and took refuge in the Indian Embassy in Geneva in Switzerland.

After the incident, Mangro sailed to Pakistan under the command of Lieutenant-Commander Shamim Khalid and reported to its base in Karachi. On 22 November 1971, Mangro was deployed under the command of Lieutenant-Commander Shamim to patrol off the Arabian Sea, and eventually detected the Indian Navy's armada that was sent to attack Karachi. No attack was carried out as both nations had not officially declared war, but she tracked the squadron.

On 2 December 1971, Mangro reported back to her base, only to witness the attack on Karachi by the squadron she had tracked earlier had been commenced. During its war operations, Mangro continued her operations and reported back to base safely after the ceasefire between the two nations was reached.

On 2 January 2006, she was decommissioned having completed 34-years of service with the Pakistan Navy.

References

External links
 
 

1970 ships
Ships built in France
Hangor-class submarines (Daphné-class)
Maritime incidents in 1971
Bangladesh Liberation War